The Corcovado Rack Railway is a mountain rack railway in Rio de Janeiro, Brazil, from Cosme Velho to the summit of Corcovado at an elevation of . The summit is famous for its giant statue of Christ the Redeemer and for its views over the city and beaches.

History 

The railway was opened by Emperor Dom Pedro II of Brazil on 9 October 1884. Initially hauled by steam locomotives, the line was electrified in 1910, a first in Brazil. It was re-equipped in 1980 with trains built by Swiss Locomotive and Machine Works (SLM) of Winterthur, Switzerland, and these were in turn replaced in 2019 by vehicles from SLM's successor company Stadler Rail.

The line has been ridden by many famous people, including Pope Pius XII, Pope John Paul II, Alberto Santos-Dumont, Albert Einstein and Diana, Princess of Wales.

Route and operation 

The termini are the historic base station in Cosme Velho and the summit of Corcovado.

The railway was built using metre gauge and the Riggenbach rack system, and has a maximum incline of 30%. It is one of the few remaining railways using three-phase electric power with two overhead wires, at 900 V 60 Hz.

Passengers ride in custom-built electric multiple units (EMU) made by Stadler. During the descent, energy is recovered by regenerative braking, which leads to a saving of 75% of the overall power consumption.

There are three trains, each made of two cars. The trip takes approximately 20 minutes and departs every 20 minutes, giving a capacity of 540 passengers per hour. Due to this limited capacity the wait at the entry station can be several hours. As of March 2021, the line operates from 08:00 to 19:00 (8 am to 7 pm).).

References

General reference 
Article "Rio de Janeiro: City of contrasts, quality metro" by C. J. Wansbeek, in Tramways & Urban Transit magazine, March 2005, published by the Light Rail Transit Association.

External links 
Corcovado Rack Railway website
Virtual Pictour with information @ The Rio de Janeiro Photo Guide

Mountain railways
Transport in Rio de Janeiro (city)
Railways using three-phase power
Railway lines opened in 1884
Metre gauge railways in Brazil
Rack railways in Brazil
Electric railways in Brazil